Péteri is a village in Pest county, Hungary. It is situated between the towns of Monor and Üllő, immediately east of the Budapest International Airport. Péteri has an Evangelical church.

References

Populated places in Pest County